Zhang Yuxin (born February 20, 1989 in Heilongjiang, China) is an alpine skier from China. He competed for China at the 2014 Winter Olympics in the slalom and giant slalom.

References 

1989 births
Living people
Chinese male alpine skiers
Olympic alpine skiers of China
Alpine skiers at the 2014 Winter Olympics
Skiers from Heilongjiang
21st-century Chinese people